The first edition of the West African Nations Cup was held in Benin between 13 February and 23 February 1982. The title was won by Nigeria.

Group 1 
 

Group matches

Group 2 
 

Group matches

Knockout stages

Result

External links 
1982 West African Nations Cup
Statistics

West African Nations Cup
1982
West
February 1982 sports events in Africa
1982 in Beninese sport